Hoor, Garhwa  is a village in Garhwa district of Jharkhand state of India.

References

Villages in Garhwa district